Vadh (meaning: Execution) is a 2022 Indian Hindi-language thriller film written and directed by Jaspal Singh Sandhu, Rajiv Barnwal and produced by Luv Films. Vadh was  theatrically released on 9 December 2022.

Plot 
Shambhunath Mishra is an old man who lives with his wife, Manju Mishra, in a dilapidated house in Gwalior. He is barely able to make ends meet with his pension and as a tutor to the local kids. The couple have a son, who has settled in America with his family and is least concerned about his parents.

To send his son to America, Shambhunath took an enormous loan from a bank and a loan shark, Prajapati Pandey, by mortgaging his house to Prajapati. The bank's EMIs are automatically deducted from his pension and sometimes he is short on his installments to Prajapati. Being a criminal, Prajapati thoroughly exploits Shambhunath. Naina is a bubbly school-going kid, the only source of happiness in the lives of the Mishra family, whose lives are otherwise tragic. She comes to their home regularly for tuition.

Shakti Singh is a corrupt cop, who is on the payroll of Prajapati. However, Shakti demands higher bribes for his increased criminal activities. Prajapati is annoyed, but has little choice as Shakti is the frontman for the local MLA, Dada, who is handling the criminal operations from behind the scenes. Prajapati does not want the matter to escalate to Dada and has to quickly think of a way to deal with Shakti.

He decides to sell Shambhunath's house and threatens him to vacate it in 2 days. As he is doing this, he preys on Naina, who is studying at Shambhunath's home. Shambhunath goes to the police station to file a complaint and finds Prajapati chatting with a visibly annoyed Shakti. After Prajapati leaves, Shambhunath requests Shakti to resolve the issue, who flatly refuses. Later that night, when Shambhunath is alone at home, Prajapati arrives and assaults him. After he calms down, he tells Shambhunath to fetch Naina for him, for an hour. This is the breaking point for Shambhunath and in a fit of rage, he stabs Prajapati in the throat with a screwdriver. When Manju returns home, she is shocked to find Prajapati dead. Shambhunath calms her down and disposes of the body. Manju, out of shock and anger, stops speaking with him. Yet, she cooperates with him when Shakti comes over for an investigation, but is shattered when Prajapati's distressed wife shows up with her daughter and pleads for information about her husband. Out of guilt, Shambhunath goes to the police station and confesses his crime with a detailed description to the constable, since Shakti has gone elsewhere, but the constable dismisses it as a plot from a fictional crime magazine. 

When Shambhunath reveals his motive for killing Prajapati to his wife, she fully supports him and he feels guilt and stress-free. The next day, Shakti asks him to sign a confession of the murder, to which he refuses, owing to the lack of evidence. Shakti later meets him outside the police station and tells him that he would absolve him from the murder charges, if he hands him Prajapati's phone, to which Shambhunath again refuses. When he reaches home, he finds Prajapati's phone and goes to get a charger for it and checks the content of the phone. On returning, he sees that Dada is forcibly vacating his house. After a confrontation, Dada gives him 3 days to repay his entire loan. 

Shambhunath then finally hands over Prajapati's phone to Shakti, which has a video of him having an affair with Dada's wife. As a part of the deal, Shakti then arrests Dada on murder charges of Prajapati, with the murder weapon and blood-stained clothes presumably recovered from the premises of Dada. After all this turmoil, Shambhunath and Manju give their house to Naina and her family, who are shown to be living in impoverished conditions.

Cast 

 Sanjay Mishra as Shambhunath Mishra
 Neena Gupta as Manju Mishra 
 Saurabh Sachdeva as Prajapati Pandey 
 Manav Vij as Shakti Singh
 Umesh Kaushik as Navin 
 Diwakar Kumar as Diwakar Mishra 
 Pranjal Pateriya as Bakery owner 
 Abhitosh Singh Rajput as Pawan  
 Tanya Lal

Critical reception 
Sonal Pandya reviewing for Hindustan Times praised the performances of Mishra and Gupta. Pooja Biraia Jaiswal reviewing for The Week rated 4/5 and praised Mishra and Gupta. Deepa Gahlot reviewing for Scroll.in praised the performances of Mishra, Gupta and Vij.

References

External links 

 Vadh at IMDb

Hindi-language thriller films
2022 thriller drama films
2020s Hindi-language films